Veith is a surname. Notable people with the surname include:

 Andrew Veith (born 1991), American climber, producer, and writer
Anna Veith (born 1989), Austrian alpine ski racer
Bob Veith (1926–2006), American racing driver
Johann Veith (1916–1945), German SS officer
Johann Emanuel Veith (1787–1876), Czech Roman Catholic priest
, born 1944) German chemist
Michael Veith (born 1957), German alpine skier
 (born 1957), German biologist
Oswin Veith (born 1961), German politician (CSU)
Robin Veith, American television writer
Walter Veith,  South African zoologist and a Seventh-day Adventist lay preacher

Surnames from given names